Hannah Jones (born 2 September 1996) is a Welsh snooker player who has won the English Ladies championship and the WLBSA World Ladies Junior Title 5 times, achieving a highest world ranking position of 6. Jones first played snooker at the Wellington Snooker Club, Cardiff in 2003.

Results
Jones's achievements include the following.

Snooker competition results
World Ladies Junior Champion - won 5 times - 2008 / 2009 / 2010 / 2011 / 2013
World Ladies Doubles Champion - 2009
World Ladies Connie Gough Under 21 Champion - 2014
World Ladies Connie Gough Junior Champion - won 2 times - 2010 / 2011
World Ladies East Anglian Junior Champion - won 3 times - 2008 / 2009 / 2010
World Ladies East Anglian Under 40 Shield Champion - 2011
World Ladies South Coast Classic Under 21 Champion - 2014
World Ladies UK Junior Champion - won 3 times - 2009 / 2010 / 2012
World Ladies Northern Under 40 Shield Champion - 2011
World Ladies British Open Junior Champion - won 3 times - 2008 / 2009 / 2010
World Ladies British Open Under 21 Champion - 2013
EASB - Ladies Champion - 2010
EASB - Ladies Tour winner  - 2010
Rileys - Ronnie O'Sullivan search for a star area champion - 2010
Derbyshire Ladies Champion - 2012
Derbyshire Under 15 Champion - 2010
Derby Junior Snooker Champion - 2011
Cueball Snooker Champion - 2011
Derbyshire Team Champion - won 4 times - 2011 / 2012 / 2012 / 2013

Pool - 8 ball results

Derbyshire Ladies County Champion - won 3 times - 2009 / 2012 / 2013
Cueball Tournament winner - 2011
Jaxx Under 16 champion - 2012
Derbyshire Ladies County Finalist - 2011
Derbyshire Youth County Finalist - 2012 / 2013

Billiards results

EABA National Girls (under 19) Champion - won 4 times - 2010 / 2011 / 2012 / 2013
Welham Grice Champion - England Team - 2008

Awards

Derbyshire  Sports Awards - Junior Sportswoman of the Year - won 2 times - 2009 / 2010
Derbyshire Sports Awards - Junior Sportswoman of the Year finalist - 2008 / 2011 / 2012
DSSA Derbyshire Sports Person of the Year - won 2 times - 2009 / 2011
World Ladies Junior Player of the Year - 2011

References

External links
Official website
Hannah Jones results at WPBSA SnookerScores

1996 births
Living people
Snooker players from Cardiff
Welsh snooker players
Female snooker players